An amalgam is an alloy of mercury with another metal. It may be a liquid, a soft paste or a solid, depending upon the proportion of mercury. These alloys are formed through metallic bonding, with the electrostatic attractive force of the conduction electrons working to bind all the positively charged metal ions together into a crystal lattice structure. Almost all metals can form amalgams with mercury, the notable exceptions being iron, platinum, tungsten, and tantalum. Silver-mercury amalgams are important in dentistry, and gold-mercury amalgam is used in the extraction of gold from ore. Dentistry has used alloys of mercury  with metals such as silver, copper, indium, tin and zinc.

Important amalgams

Zinc amalgam 
Zinc amalgam finds use in organic synthesis (e.g., for the Clemmensen reduction).
It is the reducing agent in the Jones reductor, used in analytical chemistry. Formerly the zinc plates of dry batteries were amalgamated with a small amount of mercury to prevent deterioration in storage. It is a binary solution (liquid-solid) of mercury and zinc.

Potassium amalgam 
For the alkali metals, amalgamation is exothermic, and distinct chemical forms can be identified, such as KHg and KHg2. KHg is a gold-coloured compound with a melting point of 178 °C, and KHg2 a silver-coloured compound with a melting point of 278 °C. These amalgams are very sensitive to air and water, but can be worked with under dry nitrogen.  The Hg-Hg distance is around 300 picometres, Hg-K around 358 pm.

Phases K5Hg7 and KHg11 are also known; rubidium, strontium and barium undecamercurides are known and isostructural. Sodium amalgam (NaHg2) has a different structure, with the mercury atoms forming hexagonal layers, and the sodium atoms a linear chain which fits into the holes in the hexagonal layers, but the potassium atom is too large for this structure to work in KHg2.

Sodium amalgam 

Sodium amalgam is produced as a byproduct of the chloralkali process and used as an important reducing agent in organic and inorganic chemistry. With water, it decomposes into concentrated sodium hydroxide solution, hydrogen and mercury, which can then return to the chloralkali process anew. If absolutely water-free alcohol is used instead of water, an alkoxide of sodium is produced instead of the alkali solution.

Aluminium amalgam 

Aluminium can form an amalgam through a reaction with mercury. Aluminium amalgam may be prepared by either grinding aluminium pellets or wire in mercury, or by allowing aluminium wire or foil to react with a solution of mercuric chloride. This amalgam is used as a reagent to reduce compounds, such as the reduction of imines to amines. The aluminium is the ultimate electron donor, and the mercury serves to mediate the electron transfer.
The reaction itself and the waste from it contain mercury, so special safety precautions and disposal methods are needed. As an environmentally friendlier alternative, hydrides or other reducing agents can often be used to accomplish the same synthetic result. Another environmentally friendly alternative is an alloy of aluminium and gallium which similarly renders the aluminium more reactive by preventing it from forming an oxide layer.

Tin amalgam 
Tin amalgam was used in the middle of the 19th century as a reflective mirror coating.

Other amalgams 
A variety of amalgams are known that are of interest mainly in the research context.
 Ammonium amalgam is a grey, soft, spongy mass discovered in 1808 by Humphry Davy and Jöns Jakob Berzelius. It decomposes readily at room temperature or in contact with water or alcohol:
 
 Thallium amalgam has a freezing point of −58 °C, which is lower than that of pure mercury (−38.8 °C) so it has found a use in low temperature thermometers.
 Gold amalgam: Refined gold, when finely ground and brought into contact with mercury where the surfaces of both metals are clean, amalgamates readily and quickly to form alloys ranging from AuHg2 to Au8Hg.
 Lead forms an amalgam when filings are mixed with mercury and is also listed as a naturally occurring alloy called leadamalgam in the Nickel–Strunz classification.

Dental amalgam 

Dentistry has used alloys of mercury with metals such as silver, copper, indium, tin and zinc. Amalgam is an "excellent and versatile restorative material" and is used in dentistry for a number of reasons. It is inexpensive and relatively easy to use and manipulate during placement; it remains soft for a short time so it can be packed to fill any irregular volume, and then forms a hard compound. Amalgam possesses greater longevity when compared to other direct restorative materials, such as composite. However, this difference has decreased with continual development of composite resins.

Amalgam is typically compared to resin-based composites because many applications are similar and many physical properties and costs are comparable.

Dental amalgam has been studied and is generally considered to be safe for humans, though the validity of some studies and their conclusions have been questioned.

In July 2018 the EU, in consideration of the persistent pollution and environmental toxicity of amalgam's mercury, prohibited amalgam for dental treatment of children under 15 years and of pregnant or breastfeeding women.

Use in mining 
Mercury has been used in gold and silver mining because of the convenience and the ease with which mercury and the precious metals will amalgamate. In gold placer mining, in which minute specks of gold are washed from sand or gravel deposits, mercury was often used to separate the gold from other heavy minerals.

After all of the practical metal had been taken out from the ore, the mercury was dispensed down a long copper trough, which formed a thin coating of mercury on the exterior. The waste ore was then transferred down the trough, and gold in the waste amalgamated with the mercury. This coating would then be scraped off and refined by evaporation to get rid of the mercury, leaving behind somewhat high-purity gold.

Mercury amalgamation was first used on silver ores with the development of the patio process in Mexico in 1557. There were also additional amalgamation processes that were created for processing silver ores, including pan amalgamation and the Washoe process.

Gold amalgam

Gold extraction (mining) 
Gold amalgam has proved effective where gold fines ("flour gold") would not be extractable from ore using hydro-mechanical methods. Large amounts of mercury were used in placer mining, where deposits composed largely of decomposed granite slurry were separated in long runs of "riffle boxes", with mercury dumped in at the head of the run. The amalgam formed is a heavy solid mass of dull gray color. (The use of mercury in 19th century placer mining in California, now prohibited, has caused extensive pollution problems in riverine and estuarine environments, ongoing to this day.) Sometimes substantial slugs of amalgam are found in downstream river and creek bottoms by amateur wet-suited miners seeking gold nuggets with the aid of an engine-powered water vacuum/dredge mounted on a float.

Gold extraction (ore processing) 

Where stamp mills were used to crush gold-bearing ore to fines, a part of the extraction process involved the use of mercury-wetted copper plates, over which the crushed fines were washed. A periodic scraping and re-mercurizing of the plate resulted in amalgam for further processing.

Gold extraction (retorting) 
Amalgam obtained by either process was then heated in a distillation retort, recovering the mercury for reuse and leaving behind the gold. Using a retort does not release vapors to the atmosphere and is considered a safe alternative to burning the mercury off in the open environment.

Today, mercury amalgamation has been replaced by other methods to recuperate gold and silver from ore in developed nations. Hazards of mercurial toxic waste have played a major role in the phasing out of the mercury amalgamation processes. However, mercury amalgamation is still regularly used by small-scale gold placer miners (often illegally), particularly in developing countries.

Amalgam probe 

Mercury salts are, compared to mercury metal and amalgams, highly toxic due to their solubility in water. The presence of these salts in water can be detected with a probe that uses the readiness of mercury ions to form an amalgam with copper. A nitric acid solution of salts under investigation is applied to a piece of copper foil, and any mercury ions present will leave spots of silvery-coloured amalgam. Silver ions leave similar spots but are easily washed away, making this a means of distinguishing silver from mercury.

The redox reaction involved where mercury oxidizes the copper is:

Hg2+ + Cu → Hg + Cu2+.

See also
 Caesium#Physical properties
 Pan amalgamation
 Patio process

References

Further reading 
 Prandtl, W.: Humphry Davy, Jöns Jacob Berzelius, zwei führende Chemiker aus der ersten Hälfte des 19. Jahrhunderts. Wissenschaftliche Verlagsgesellschaft, Stuttgart, 1948
 Hofmann, H., Jander, G.: Qualitative Analyse, 1972, Walter de Gruyter,

External links